The Belgo-British Conference is a recurring conference organised by the Belgian Federal Public Service Foreign Affairs, the British Foreign, Commonwealth and Development Office, the Egmont Institute and the British Council.
 
The aim of the conference is to enrich bilateral relations by bringing together politicians, business people, academics, journalists, and other opinion-formers to debate themes of common and crucial importance to Belgium and the United Kingdom.

History 
The Belgo-British Conference was first held in 2000, having been an idea discussed by Belgian Prime Minister Guy Verhofstadt and British Prime Minister Tony Blair, when they met for the first time in Downing Street in November 1999.

The first edition took place in Bruges in 2000. The location of the conference would alternate annually between the United Kingdom and Belgium and takes place under the Chatham House Rule. After the fifteenth edition in 2014, the conference was stopped being held until it was reinvigorated in 2022.
 
The Belgo-British Conference is currently chaired by Sir Robin Niblett (Director and Chief Executive of Chatham House) and Ambassador Johan Verbeke (former Belgian Ambassador to the UK), who preside over a board which agrees the theme of the conference. Previous chairs include Sir Stephen Wall, Ambassador Lode Willems, André Villeneuve, Count Georges Jacobs de Hagen, Baron Paul Buysse and Lord Simon of Highbury.

Editions

References

External links
Belgian Embassy to the UK
Belgian Federal Public Service Foreign Affairs
Egmont Institute
British Embassy to Belgium
British Foreign, Commonwealth and Development Office
British Council in Brussels

United Kingdom friendship associations
International conferences in Belgium
International conferences in the United Kingdom
Annual events in Europe
Belgium–United Kingdom relations